St. George Orthodox Valiya Pally is a prominent church that belongs to the Malankara Orthodox Syrian Church. This church is situated beside the Puthuppally - Changanassery road about a kilometre from the Puthuppally junction, on the eastern bank of the Kodoor river.  The surrounding areas of church are panoramic and very beautiful.  The old church was well preserved church with wall murals dating back to ancient times. These unique wall murals have been painted using vegetable dyes.

History 

This ancient church, known as "PUTHUPPALLY PALLY" or "PUTHUPPALLY VALIYAPALLY", situated on the eastern bank of the rivulet Kodoorar and beside the Puthuppally-Changancherry road about a kilometre away from Puthuppally junction was rebuilt, expanded or renovated five times during its four and a half century existence.

It was originally built as a "kochu pally" (chapel) in the name of St. Mary in AD 1557 near Vazhakulam Hindu temple on a hillock which later came to be known as Kochupallikunnu. Eight decades later in AD 1640 it was shifted and rebuilt in the name of Mar Bahanan Sahada at Elamthuruthi Kunnu, the present location.

110 years afterwards, in AD 1750, the church was rebuilt in the name of St. George, retaining the main portions of Mar Bahanan Church.

The church was rebuilt and consecrated in AD 2003 transforming it into a composite shrine of three churches. The church of St. George was retained and the verandas on either side of it were replaced by a chapel in the name of St. Mary on the north side and a chapel in the name of St. Bahanan on the south side. The St. Mary’s chapel of 1557 and St. Bahanan’s church of 1640 were revived and rebuilt on either side of St. George’s church of 1750.

The main altar of St. George's church is in the name of St. George and those on the left and right are in the names of St. Thomas and St. Gregorius of Parumala respectively. The main altar of St. Mary’s chapel is in the name of St. Mary and those on the left and right are respectively in the names of Morth Shmooni and Mortha Yulithi.

The main altar of St. Bahanan’s chapel is in the name of St. Bahanan and those on the left and right are respectively in the names of St. Vattasseril Geevarghese Dionysius and Kuriakose Mar Gregorius of Pampady, for a total of nine intercessors in the new shrine. Thousands of devotees of all religions visit the shrine throughout the year and particularly during the feast of St. George, including the 10 days preceding and succeeding it.
Now the Church has more than 1000 Families.

Pilgrim centre
The present shrine was declared as the "Georgian Pilgrim Centre of the East" by Baselius Didymus I Catholicos of the East in the year AD 2007.

Puthuppaly Perunal (The Feast of St. George)

Kodiyet (flag hoisting)
Ten days before the feast two arecanut palm flag masts, one each from Puthuppally and Ericadu hamlets are brought to Puthuppally junction and; from there they are carried to the church in a ceremonial procession by a large crowd with orchestral accompaniment. Both the flag masts are erected in front of the church; the flags are blessed and hoisted by the priest and hailed by crowd. The next ten days are very hectic. "Chendamelam" (traditional orchestral drum beatings), "Kathinaveddi" (native cannon shots) at the foot of the flag masts, daily morning Qurbana (the holy mass), "Sandhyanamaskaram" (evening prayers) in the church and; in between, other allied programs in the church premise are the salient feature during these days.

Virakedeel, Vechoot and Nercha Vilampu
Virakedeel (Fire Wood Collection and Procession), Vechoot (Mass Luncheon) and Nercha Vilampu (Offerings Distribution)

Thousands participate in the main feast on 7 May. After the holy mass, it is customary to provide meals to the devotees (Vechoot). Devotees bring children on this day for their first rice feed at the hands of priests (Adya choroonu). After "Raza" (ceremonial procession) in the afternoon "Nercha Vilampu" (rice flour bread and chicken distribution) is done. As per age old practice devotees bring live fowls as offerings particularly during this feast. Chicken is prepared out of the same and served along with the appam brought as offerings by the devotees. 
Firewood for preparation of the above items is offered and collected from Puthuppally and Ericadu hamlets and brought in ceremonial procession to the church exactly in the same way as the flag masts are brought. This is known as "Virakideel". The cooking starts in the early hours of the main feast day.

Rasa (Ceremonial Procession)
The gold cross is taken out and after traditional prayers and rites it is placed on the main altar after holy mass on 6 May. On the same day evening processions from the "Kurisin Thotty" (Cross Towers) at Kochalummoodu and Parackal Kadavu proceed towards Puthuppally church and reach there at about 8pm. From there a larger procession of devotees carrying Wooden cross, Gold cross, Silver crosses, Muthukudas (Artistic umbrellas), Flags, Lit up candles etc. with traditional orchestral accompaniments is taken out. The procession passes through Kuttenchirapaddy, Nilackal pallypaddy and reaches the "Kurisin Thotty" at Puthuppally junction, where prayers are held, reaches Puthuppally pally at about 9 PM and ends with prayers and blessing. People on the route greet it in front of their houses or shops with wick lamps and candles before an intercessor’s photo, and they are blessed by the main priest in the procession.

Deepa Kazhacha (Light Display) Karimarunnu Prayogam (Fire works)
The paddy fields in front of the church are usually flooded in May. Thousands of wick lamps are lit and floated in coconut shells in these waters on the evening of 6 May before the processions.
The feast ends with a firework display soon after the procession.

Notable fathers of the Church 
 Paret Mathews Mar Ivanios was a member of the church and served as priest
 Narimattathil Yuhanon Mar Severios served as a priest.

Institutions run by the church 
 St. George L.P. School, Angady, Puthuppally
 Georgian Public School, Puthuppally

Gallery

See also
 Saint George: Devotions, traditions and prayers

References

External links
 Official Website of St. George Orthodox Church (Puthuppally Pally)
 "The Indian Orthodox Church History" video

Religious organizations established in the 1640s
Churches in Kottayam district
Malankara Orthodox Syrian church buildings
Oriental Orthodox congregations established in the 17th century
1557 establishments in Asia